The 1994–95 Iran 2nd Division football season was played in one groups of ten teams each. The top three teams (Bahman, Bank Melli, Polyacryl Esfahan) gained promotion to the Azadegan League.

References 
 www.rsssf.com

League 2 (Iran) seasons
Iran
2